Captain Charles Philip Allen (born 3 April 1899 – 6 January 1974) was a British World War I flying ace credited with seven aerial victories.

Born in Liverpool, Allen joined the Royal Flying Corps as an officer cadet, and was commissioned as a Temporary Second Lieutenant on 26 September 1917.

He was posted to 204 Squadron RAF on 5 April 1918, and shot down seven Fokker D.VIIs between June and November, while flying the Sopwith Camel.

Allen received two awards from Belgium, being gazetted a Chevalier de l'Ordre de la Couronne ("Knight of the Order of the Crown") on 8 February 1919, and being awarded the Croix de Guerre by His Majesty the King of the Belgians on 15 July 1919.

References

1899 births
1974 deaths
Royal Air Force personnel of World War I
British World War I flying aces
Military personnel from Liverpool
Recipients of the Croix de guerre (Belgium)
Recipients of the Order of the Crown (Belgium)